A V10 is an engine with ten cylinders in two banks of five.

V10 or V-10 may also refer to:

 ATC code V10 (therapeutic radiopharmaceuticals), a subgroup of the Anatomical Therapeutic Chemical Classification System
 V.10, an ITU-T recommendation for data communication
 Version 10 Unix
 LG V10, an Android smartphone manufactured by LG Electronics

See also
 North American Rockwell OV-10 Bronco, an American observation and light attack aircraft